The Macao Daily News (Portuguese: DIÁRIO DE MACAU), established on 15 August 1958, is a daily newspaper published in Macau with the background of the Chinese Communist Party. It was launched on August 15, 1958 and is now the largest newspaper in Macau, accounting for 70% to 80% of the city's newspaper circulation. It is one of two popular Chinese language dailies.

See also
 Media of Macau

External links 
  

Chinese-language newspapers (Traditional Chinese)
Newspapers published in Macau
Publications with year of establishment missing
Publications established in 1958